Olympia Fields Country Club is a private golf club in the central United States, located in Olympia Fields, Illinois, a suburb of Chicago, about  south of The Loop. It contains two eighteen-hole courses, North and South. The North Course is considered one of the top three courses in the Chicago area, and is generally ranked in the top 50 courses in the United States. The South Course is regularly ranked in the top ten in Illinois. Olympia Fields is one of the few private clubs in the U.S. with multiple courses ranked, and it is on the National Register of Historic Places.

History
The club was founded  in 1915. The first Club President was Amos Alonzo Stagg, the famous college football head coach and athletic director at nearby University of Chicago. The main dining room of the club is named in his honor. The North Course was designed by two-time British Open champion Willie Park, Jnr, and was lengthened prior to hosting the U.S. Open in 2003. It features some significant elevation changes, a meandering creek and hundreds of native oak trees. At one time it was one of four courses at the club, but after the club fell into financial difficulties during World War II, it was forced to sell off half of its land. Course No. 4 became the North Course, and the remaining holes from the other three courses were reconfigured to make the South Course.

Olympia Fields has hosted four major championships: two U.S. Opens (1928, 2003) and two PGA Championships (1925, 1961). It has also been the site of the U.S. Senior Open (1997) the U.S. Amateur (2015), and the 2017 KPMG Women's PGA Championship. In addition, the Western Open on the PGA Tour was played at the club 

Olympia Fields is famous for its enormous clubhouse, which was finished in 1925 at a cost of $1.3 million. The western boundary of the property is bordered by a commuter rail line, Metra Electric District, and its Olympia Fields station is just west of the clubhouse; the line was previously the Illinois Central Railroad.

In 2005, the club began a $9.5 million renovation project to improve the practice facilities, revamp some of the bunkers, and make other improvements.

Tournaments hosted

Major championships
Includes amateur and professional major championships

Bolded years are major championships on the PGA Tour.
The PGA Championship was match play until 1958

Other tournaments
The Western Open was historically an important event in golf, a near-major.

Scorecards

Source:

Source:

References

External links

Sports venues in Cook County, Illinois
Golf clubs and courses in Illinois
National Register of Historic Places in Cook County, Illinois
1915 establishments in Illinois
Sports venues on the National Register of Historic Places in Illinois
Sports venues completed in 1915
Golf clubs and courses on the National Register of Historic Places